SMK Seksyen 10 Kota Damansara (or SMK S10), is a government school serving forms 1-6. It is located in Kota Damansara, Selangor, Malaysia, just beside the community forest.

History
SMK Seksyen 10 Kota Damansara received its first intake of students in 2001. However, due to delayed construction, the school buildings were incomplete and students were required to share classrooms with SK Seksyen 6 Kota Damansara. Construction of the new school was finished in 2002.

Enrolment
The majority of the students are Malay, followed by Indian, Chinese, and other ethnic groups.

Sports
In football, the school was the winner of the U-18 tournament in 2005 and 2006. Other sports played at the school include badminton, softball, basketball, ping pong, and netball.

Majlis Tilawah Al-Quran (MTQ) competition
This school have won 6 times in 6 years from 2009-2014 
competition available is :
- Nasyid (Irsyady Voice)
- Hafazan (L & P)
- Syarahan Spontan (L & P)
- Tilawah Al-Quran(L & P)

References 

Schools in Selangor